The Herald of Christian Science is a magazine published in multiple languages by the Christian Science Publishing Society. It was first published as a German magazine in 1903, and grew to include other languages as well. The magazine is currently published in four languages monthly, and quarterly in 14 other languages. Until the 1990s the magazine was bilingual, with English and translated texts side by side. Along with articles and accounts of healing, each issue includes a directory of Christian Science churches, practitioners and other listings applicable to each language. There is also a Herald radio program.

Notes

References

External links
 

1903 establishments in Germany
Christian Science magazines
Monthly magazines published in Germany
Magazines established in 1903
Multilingual magazines